L'Americano (Italian for "The American") may refer to:

 L'americano (Piccinni), a 1772 intermezzo by Niccolò Piccinni
 "Tu Vuò Fà L'Americano", a 1956 song performed by Renato Carosone
 "L'Americano" (The Gypsy Queens), a 2012 cover of Carosone's song

See also 
 Americano (disambiguation)